The Jammu Rajdhani Express  connects Jammu Tawi and New Delhi.  It is the Rajdhani Express series train on the Jammu Tawi–New Delhi section. Its number is 12425 / 12426.

Service 

This train was introduced on 10 July 1994. The 12425 / 12426 Rajdhani Express is the fastest train on the Jammu Tawi–New Delhi section. It used to run weekly once until 2009. In 2009 its frequency was increased from weekly to daily. It operates daily as train number 12426 from Jammu Tawi to New Delhi railway station and as train number 12425 in the reverse direction. It covers a distance of 577 kilometres in each direction however it takes 9 hours 15 mins when operating as train number 12426 at an average speed of 75 km/h (excluding halts) while its return journey takes 9 hrs at an average speed of 74 km/h (excluding halts).

Halts
It has 2 halts in either direction at Pathankot Cantonment, and Ludhiana.
It is the shortest Rajdhani Express in terms of distance.

Loco link and rake
This train used to run with ICF coach. Currently it runs with LHB rakes.
This train comprises all AC LHB rakes. Jammu Rajdhani Express runs with Ghaziabad-based WAP-5 or WAP-7 electric loco.Earlier before electrification   this train was hauled by a WDM3A or WDM3D locomotive.

Gallery

Coach composition

See also
 Jammu Mail
 Uttar Sampark Kranti Express
 Jammu Tawi
 Jhelum Express
 Shalimar Express
 Jammu–Baramulla line

References

Transport in Delhi
Transport in Jammu
Rail transport in Jammu and Kashmir
Rajdhani Express trains
Rail transport in Delhi
Rail transport in Punjab, India
Railway services introduced in 1994